Bigambo Rochat (born 29 May 1991) is a Swiss footballer who currently plays for Yverdon-Sport FC.

Career 
Rochat began his career with FC Renens after which he moved to FC Crissier in March 2002. His stay in Crissier lasted just twenty three months before was scouted from Lausanne-Sport, making the move in February 2004. At Lausanne he played two games with the first team in the Challenge League and was also a member of Team Vaud, the academy team. Then on 23 September 2008 he moved to top French club Lille.

On 9 April 2009 the 18-year-old defender left Lille to sign a five-year deal with Sion until 2014. However, his stay would last less than two years as he returned to his former club Lausanne-Sport, joining them 25 September 2010, though he was released at the end of the season.

In July 2011, Bigambo Rochat signed a contract for Swiss team Neuchâtel Xamax. At the end of the season, he moved on to Yverdon-Sport FC in July 2012 following Xamax's financial troubles and relegation to the fifth tier.

International 
Rochat has represented Switzerland at various youth levels including. He featured for the Swiss under-17 team at the 2008 UEFA European Under-17 Football Championship in Turkey.

References

External links 
 Career history at ASF
 Pro Soccer Management Profile

1991 births
Living people
Swiss men's footballers
Association football defenders
Association football midfielders
Swiss Challenge League players
Swiss Super League players
FC Lausanne-Sport players
FC Sion players
Neuchâtel Xamax FCS players
Yverdon-Sport FC players
Switzerland youth international footballers